Preeda Chullamondhol (21 August 1945 – 28 March 2010) was a Thai cyclist. He competed in the 1000m time trial and team pursuit events at the 1964 Summer Olympics.

References

1945 births
2010 deaths
Preeda Chullamondhol
Preeda Chullamondhol
Cyclists at the 1964 Summer Olympics
Place of birth missing
Asian Games medalists in cycling
Cyclists at the 1962 Asian Games
Cyclists at the 1966 Asian Games
Medalists at the 1962 Asian Games
Medalists at the 1966 Asian Games
Preeda Chullamondhol
Preeda Chullamondhol
Preeda Chullamondhol
Preeda Chullamondhol